Masoutis (Greek: Μασούτης) is a supermarket chain in Greece. The company was established in 1976 by Diamantis Masoutis, its current owner, and the first Masoutis supermarket opened the same year in Thessaloniki city center. Masoutis is the largest regional retail grocery chain in Greece, and the seventh largest supermarket chain in Greece in terms of market share. As of 2010, the company had 193 retail and 17 cash-and-carry stores, all located in Northern Greece and Northeastern Aegean. The company has no plans to expand into Southern Greece or the Greek islands.

External links 
 Masoutis website (in Greek and English)
Masoutis Offers Brochure (in Greek)

Supermarkets of Greece
Companies based in Thessaloniki
Greek brands
Retail companies established in 1976
Supermarkets